Sugaldi (also Romanized as Sūgaldī; also known as Sūkadlī, Sookatlī, Sūgatlī, Sugetli, Sūkat, and Sūkatlī) is a village in Qara Bashlu Rural District, Chapeshlu District, Dargaz County, Razavi Khorasan Province, Iran. At the 2006 census, its population was 112, in 20 families.

References 

Populated places in Dargaz County